The Libyan Army is the brand for a number of separate military forces in Libya, which were under the command of the internationally recognised Government of National Accord (GNA).

Since December 2015 the groups of the Libyan Army has been nominally subordinated to the internationally recognised Government of National Accord (GNA) based in Tripoli. Due to the instability in the country in 2011 civil war and the outbreak of a new conflict in 2014, the Libyan ground forces remain structurally divided, with components constituting the Tobruk-based Libyan National Army (LNA) under the command of Khalifa Haftar. The forces loyal to the GNA have been fighting against various other factions in Libya, including the Islamic State. Some efforts have been made to create a truly national army, but most of the forces under the Tripoli government's command consist of various militia groups, such as the Tripoli Protection Force, and local factions from cities like Misrata and Zintan.

Organization 
There are two main warfare organization sin Libya: GNA Libyan army and LNA. The other major military force in Libya is the Libyan National Army (LNA), which in 2014 evolved from what was originally called the LNA in 2011 following the fall of Muammar Gaddafi. In 2014, the LNA came under the control of Marshal Khalifa Haftar and the House of Representatives, whose geographical location is in the eastern Libyan city of Tobruk.

In 2017, there was no truly unified army or air force under the Presidential Council's command, and only the Libyan Navy was fully operating under the GNA's control. The Tripoli government aimed to integrate many different militia groups into a regular command structure, and created a Presidential Guard. Prime Minister Sarraj hold the role of supreme commander of the army. The Libyan Army is commanded by the GNA Defense Ministry, which was initially led by Colonel Al-Mahdi Al-Barghathi from 2016 until he was removed in July 2018, at which point GNA Prime Minister Fayez al-Sarraj took on the role of defense minister. The Chief of the General Staff was Major General Abdel Rahman al-Taweel, from September 2017 until his removal in February 2019, being replaced by Lieutenant General Mohammed al-Shareef.

2017–2018
Since the establishment of the Government of National Accord in 2016 clashes continued to occur between different factions in Tripoli nominally loyal to the new UN-backed unity government, leaving hundreds dead. Khalifa al-Ghawil proclaimed the creation of a new government consisting of the former General National Congress. Elements of the Presidential Guard defected to the rebels and took over key buildings in the capital. Pro-GNA forces eventually were able to defeat the GNC coup attempt. Around mid-2017, militias allied to the GNA fully secured the capital. In August 2018 fighting broke out between different groups in Tripoli that were all nominally subordinated to the GNA's defense ministry, forcing Prime Minister Sarraj to call in other militias from different towns outside the capital. A unit called the 7th Brigade had rebelled, leading to its dissolution.

2019
On 6 April 2019, a joint operations room was formed in response to Khalifa Haftar's attack on Tripoli to coordinate their military forces. It is led by Western military zone commander Osama al-Juwaili and includes the heads of the Tripoli and Central military zones, the Counter-Terrorism Force, and representatives from the Presidential Guard and Military Intelligence Bureau.

In response to a common interest in defending Tripoli against the LNA, the armed militias that in mid 2019 composed the armed forces of the GNA coordinated with one another mainly by agreement among armed group commanders rather than by the official command structure. The militias remained mostly autonomous in decision-making while formally being integrated into the GNA chain of command. Lacher Wolfram, writing in a Security Assessment in North Africa publication, described this as "bottom-up integration" and a "remarkable development" that "could potentially serve as a starting point for the creation of properly integrated forces ... [with] loyalty to a unified command structure".

Military zones 
On 1 June 2017, the GNA announced the creation of seven military zones throughout Libya. They include Tripoli, Benghazi, Tobruk, Sabha (Southern), Kufra, Central (from Misrata to Zuwetina), and Western (west of Tripoli to Jebel Nafusa) . The commanders of each zone were responsible for training and preparation of the forces in their area and answered to the Libyan army chief of staff. Not all of the territories accounted for were under the GNA's control at the time.

The leaders of the military zones are as follows.
Tripoli: Maj. Gen. Abdel Basset Marwan (from 14 March 2018) – Militia leader from Tripoli.
Western: Maj. Gen. Osama al-Juwaili (from 4 June 2017) – Zintan military council leader.
Central: Maj. Gen. Mohammed al-Haddad (from 4 June 2017) – Halbous Brigade leader from Misrata.
Southern (Sabha): Ali Kanna (from 6 February 2019) – Tuareg militia leader.
Kufra: Brig. Belgasim al-Abaj – tribal leader from Kufra.

Known units 
Tripoli Protection Force
Shura Council of Benghazi Revolutionaries
Libya Shield Force
Petroleum Facilities Guard
Tuareg militias in Fezzan
Tripoli Revolutionaries Brigade
Abu Saleem Central Security Force
Turkish military advisory personnel: 35

Allies 
One of the GNA main allies is Turkey. Turkey had deployed weapons and equipment to GNA trups even before the Government of National Accord (GNA) requested Turkish military support in December 2019. Turkey's engagement for the GNA is linked to its broader strategic interests in the Eastern Mediterranean: in November, Turkey and GNA leader Fayez al-Serraj signed a defense cooperation deal. At the same time GNA and Turkey agreed one on maritime boundaries in the Eastern Mediterranean, where Turkey is locked in a dispute with regional rivals Greece, Cyprus, Egypt and Israel over access to sea regions rich in natural gas.

Equipment

Weapons

Artillery

Vehicles
 Main battle tank
T-54/T-55  (210 in service)
T-62 
T-72 
M60 Patton 
 Infantry fighting vehicle
BMP-1  (740 in service)
BMP-3  (At least 50 in service)
FNSS ACV-15  (50+ in service)
M113  (70+ in service)
FNSS PARS 8X8 
 Armored cars
BRDM-2  (350 in service)
EE-9 Cascavel  (70 in service)
Armoured personnel carrier
EE-11 Urutu  
OT-64 SKOT 
BMC Kirpi 
BMC Vuran 
BTR-60  (540 in service)
Streit Cougar 
Streit Typhoon 
Military trucks
Mercedes-Benz NG (6×6) 
 Pickup trucks
Toyota Landcruiser J79 
Toyota Hilux 
Armored Ford F350 Gun Truck
 Mitsubishi L200 
SUVs
 Toyota Land Cruiser 
 Lexus LX570

References

Further reading
 

Military of Libya